Kāfiristān, or Kāfirstān (Pashto: کاپیرستان), is a historical region that covered present-day Nuristan Province in Afghanistan and its surroundings. This historic region lies on, and mainly comprises, the basins of the rivers Alingar, Pech (Kamah), Landai Sin river and Kunar, and the intervening mountain ranges. It is bounded by the main range of the Hindu Kush on the north, Pakistan's Chitral District to the east, the Kunar Valley in the south and the Alishang River in the west.

Kafiristan took its name from the enduring kafir (non-Muslim) Nuristani inhabitants who once followed a distinct form of ancient Hinduism mixed with locally developed accretions; they were thus known to the surrounding predominantly Sunni Muslim population as Kafirs, meaning "disbelievers" or "infidels". They are closely related to the Kalash people, a fiercely independent people with a distinctive culture, language and religion.

The area extending from modern Nooristan to Kashmir was known as "Peristan", a vast area containing a host of "Kafir" cultures and Indo-European languages that became Islamized over a long period of time, which eventually led them to become Muslim on the orders of Emir Abdur Rahman Khan who conquered the territory in 1895–96. The region was earlier surrounded by Buddhist states that temporarily brought literacy and state rule to the mountains; the decline of Buddhism heavily isolated the region. It was surrounded by Muslim states in the 16th century.

Etymology 
Kafiristan or Kafirstan is normally taken to mean "land [-stan] of the kafirs" in the Persian language, where the name   is derived from the Arabic  , literally meaning a person who refuses to accept a principle of any nature and figuratively as a person refusing to accept Islam as his faith; it is commonly translated into English as a "non-believer". However, the influence from district names in Kafiristan of Katwar or Kator and the ethnic name Kati has also been suggested.  Kafiristan was inhabited by people who followed a form of Paganism before their conversion to Islam in 1895–1896.

History of Kafiristan

Ancient history 

Ancient Kapiśa janapada, located south-east of the Hindukush, included and is related to Kafiristan. The Chinese pilgrim Xuanzang who visited Kapisa in 644 AD calls it Kai-pi-shi(h) (迦畢試; standard Chinese: Jiābìshì < Middle Chinese ZS: *kɨɑ-piɪt̚-ɕɨH). Xuanzang describes Kai-pi-shi as a flourishing kingdom ruled by a Buddhist kshatriya king holding sway over ten neighbouring states, including Lampaka, Nagarahara, Gandhara and Bannu. Until the 9th century AD, Kapiśi remained the second capital of the Shahi dynasty of Kabul. Kapiśa was known for goats and their skin. Xuanzang talks of Shen breed of horses from Kapiśa (Kai-pi-shi). There is also a reference to Chinese emperor Taizong being presented with an excellent breed of horses in 637 AD by an envoy from Chi-pin (Kapisa). Further evidence from Xuanzang shows that Kai-pi-shi produced a variety of cereals, many kinds of fruits, and a scented root called yu-kin, probably of the grass khus, or vetiver. The people used woollen and fur clothes; also gold, silver and copper coins. Objects of merchandise from all parts were found here.

Medieval history 
The area extending from modern Nooristan to Kashmir was known as "Peristan", a vast area containing a host of "Kafir" cultures and Indo-European languages that became Islamized over a long period. Earlier, it was surrounded by Buddhist states and societies which temporarily extended literacy and state rule to the region. The journey to the region was perilous according to reports of Chinese pilgrims Faxian and Song Yun. The decline of Buddhism resulted in the region becoming heavily isolated. The Islamization of the nearby Badakhshan began in the 8th century and Peristan was surrounded by Muslim states in the 16th century. The Kalash people of lower Chitral are the last surviving heirs of the area.

Ghaznavids era

Early modern and later history 
The first European recorded as having visited Kafiristan was the Portuguese Jesuit missionary Bento de Góis, SJ. By his account, he visited a city named "Capherstam"  in 1602, during the course of a journey from Lahore to China.

American adventurer Colonel Alexander Gardner claimed to have visited Kafiristan twice, in 1826 and 1828. On the first occasion, Dost Mohammad, the amir of Kabul, killed members of Gardner's delegation in Afghanistan and forced him to flee from Kabul to Yarkand through west Kafiristan. On his second visit, Gardner briefly sojourned in northern Kafiristan and the Kunar Valley while returning from Yarkand.

In 1883, William Watts McNair, a British surveyor on leave, explored the area disguised as a hakim. He reported on the journey later that year to the Royal Geographical Society.

George Scott Robertson, medical officer during the Second Anglo-Afghan War and later British political officer in the princely state of Chitral, was given permission to explore the country of the Kafirs in 1890–91. He was the last outsider to visit the area and observe these people's polytheistic culture before their conversion to Islam. Robertson's 1896 account was entitled The Kafirs of the Hindu Kush. Though some sub-groups such as the Kom paid tribute to Chitral, the majority of Kafiristan was left on the Afghan side of the frontier in 1893, when large areas of tribal lands between Afghanistan and British India were divided into zones of control by the Durand Line.

The territory between Afghanistan and British India was demarcated between 1894 and 1896. Part of the frontier lying between Nawa Kotal in the outskirts of Mohmand country and Bashgal Valley on the outskirts of Kafiristan was demarcated by 1895 in an agreement reached on 9 April 1895. Emir Abdur Rahman Khan wanted to force every community and tribal confederation to accept his single interpretation of Islam due to it being the only uniting factor. After the subjugation of Hazaras, Kafiristan was the last remaining autonomous part.

Abdur Rahman Khan's forces invaded Kafiristan in the winter of 1895–96 and captured it in 40 days according to his autobiography. Columns invaded it from the west through Panjshir to Kullum, the strongest fort of the region. The columns from the north came through Badakhshan and from the east through Asmar. A small column also came from south-west through Laghman. The Kafirs were resettled in Laghman while the region was settled by veteran soldiers and other Afghans. The Kafirs were converted and some also converted to avoid the jizya.

A few years after Robertson's visit, in 1895–96, Abdur Rahman Khan invaded and converted the Kafirs to Islam as a symbolic climax to his campaigns to bring the country under a centralised Afghan government. He had similarly subjugated the Hazara people in 1892–93. In 1896 Abdur Rahman Khan, who had thus conquered the region for Islam, renamed the people the Nuristani ("Enlightened Ones" in Persian) and the land as Nuristan ("Land of the Enlightened").

Kafiristan was full of steep and wooded valleys. It was famous for its precise wood carving, especially of cedar-wood pillars, carved doors, furniture (including "horn chairs") and statuary. Some of these pillars survive, as they were reused in mosques, but temples, shrines, and centers of local cults, with their wooden effigies and multitudes of ancestor figures were torched and burnt to the ground. Only a small fraction brought back to Kabul as spoils of this Islamic victory over infidels. These consisted of various wooden effigies of ancestral heroes and pre-Islamic commemorative chairs. Of the more than thirty wooden figures brought to Kabul in 1896 or shortly thereafter, fourteen went to the Kabul Museum and four to the Musée Guimet and the Musée de l'Homme located in Paris.
Those in the Kabul Museum were badly damaged under the Taliban but have since been restored.

A few hundred Kati Kafirs, known as the "Red Kafirs" of the Bashgal Valley, fled across the border into Chitral but, uprooted from their homeland, they converted by the 1930s. They settled near the frontier in the valleys of Rumbur, Bumburet and Urtsun, which were then inhabited by the Kalash tribe or the Black Kafirs. Only this group in the five valleys of Birir, Bumburet, Rumbur, Jineret and Urtsun escaped conversion, because they were located east of the Durand Line in the princely state of Chitral. However, by the 1940s the southern valleys of Urtsun and Jingeret had been converted. After a decline in population caused by forced conversion in the 1970s, this region of Kafiristan in Pakistan, known as Kalasha Desh, has recently shown an increase in its population.

In early 1991, the Republic of Afghanistan government recognized the de facto autonomy of Nuristan and created a new province of that name from districts of Kunar Province and Laghman Province.

Appearances in culture 
 Kafiristan is the setting of most of Rudyard Kipling's famous 1888 novella "The Man Who Would Be King". It was adapted into the 1975 film of the same name. 
 English travel writer Eric Newby's 1958 A Short Walk in the Hindu Kush describes the adventures of himself and Hugh Carless in Nuristan and their attempt at the then-unprecedented feat of scaling the Mir Samir mountain.
 German author Herbert Kranz chose Kafiristan as the setting of his 1953 adventure novel In den Klauen des Ungenannten: Abenteuer in den Schluchten des Hindukusch.
The Journey to Kafiristan is a German film by Donatello Dubini and Fosco Dubini recounting an overland journey by Annemarie Schwarzenbach and Ella Maillart from Geneva to Kabul.
 Umberto Eco mentions Kafiristan (as "Kefiristan") in "How to Travel with a Salmon", where a bellboy spoke a dialect that was last heard in Kafiristan at the time of Alexander the Great.
Nile, an American death metal band, wrote the song "Kafir" for their album Those Whom the Gods Detest which was inspired by Kafirstan.
Kafiristan is the setting of the Madeleine Brent novel Stormswift
Was cited in Season 5 Episode 4 of the hit show Hot in Cleveland as the destination where Victoria's husband, Emmett, is hiding away.

See also 

 Nuristan Province
 Chiliss, an ancient people
 Kalash people
 Chitral Kalasha language
 Kho people
 Khowar language
 Nuristanis
 Nuristani languages
 Pashayi people
 Pashayi languages
 Shina people
 Shina language

References 

 Greg, Mortenson. Stones into Schools. Penguin Books, 2009; p. 259

External links 
 
 Map of Kafiristan 1881. Contributors Royal Geographical Society (Great Britain)

Historical regions
Kalasha Valleys
History of Nuristan Province
Geography of South Asia
Hindu Kush
History of Pakistan
Historical regions of Afghanistan
Former provinces of Afghanistan
Buddhism in Afghanistan
Landforms of Nuristan Province

sv:Nuristan